Guzzetti is a surname. Notable people with the surname include:

Alfred Guzzetti (born 1942), American experimental filmmaker
César Augusto Guzzetti (1925–1988), Argentine vice admiral
Damiano Giulio Guzzetti (born 1959), Italian Roman Catholic bishop
Michela Guzzetti (born 1992), Italian swimmer

See also
Guzzetti Chapel